Emrah Klimenta (born February 13, 1991) is a Montenegrin professional footballer who plays as a centre-back for USL Championship side Oakland Roots.

Early life
Emrah Klimenta, whose surname is derived from the Albanian highland tribe Kelmendi was born in Rožaje, Montenegro during a time of turmoil in the Balkan region as the Socialist Federative Republic of Yugoslavia was breaking apart. Klimenta and his parents initially settled in Mainz, Germany. His family then moved to the United States in 1999. They settled in Oakland, California, but later moved to Walnut Creek, California.

Career

Club
Klimenta began his youth career in the United States, playing as a midfielder and forward. He also played for the Olympic Development Program (ODP) for Cal North.

Klimenta spent time in Europe playing for MŠK Žilina and FC Ingolstadt 04, before returning to California as a midfielder for NPSL club Bay Area Ambassadors.

Klimenta joined United Soccer League club Sacramento Republic FC in March 2014, after being selected during an open tryout. Klimenta played as a defender and has started most of the league games in the 2014, 2015 and 2016 season.

In January 2018 it was announced that Klimenta had signed for LA Galaxy of Major League Soccer, ending his tenure in Sacramento as the team's all-time leader in minutes, starts, and appearances. He was released by the club on June 14, 2018.

Klimenta returned to Sacramento Republic FC for the remainder of the 2018 season.

On 4 April 2019, Klimenta joined USL side Reno 1868.

On 5 June 2021, Klimenta joined USL Championship club Oakland Roots SC.

International
In May 2016, Klimenta was called up for to the Montenegro national team for the first time for a training camp and friendly against Turkey on 29 May. On this day, Emrah made his senior debut. In the process he became the first Sacramento Republic player to receive a senior call-up while with the club.

Honors
Sacramento Republic
USL Championship: 2014

References

External links
National Football Teams profile
 

1991 births
Living people
People from Rožaje
Bosniaks of Montenegro
Soccer players from California
Association football midfielders
Montenegrin footballers
Montenegro international footballers
Sacramento Republic FC players
LA Galaxy players
LA Galaxy II players
Reno 1868 FC players
San Diego Loyal SC players
Oakland Roots SC players
USL Championship players
Major League Soccer players
Montenegrin expatriate footballers
Expatriate soccer players in the United States
Montenegrin expatriate sportspeople in the United States